Robert Bryan (and variants) may refer to:

Robert Jensen Bryan (born 1943), United States federal judge
Robert A. Bryan (1926–2017), American university professor and university president
Bob Bryan (born 1978), American tennis player
Bob Bryan (geologist), Australian geologist
Robert Bryan (tennis) (fl. 1930s), American tennis player, in 1935 U.S. National Championships – Men's Singles
Robert Bryan (poet) (1858–1920), Welsh folklorist

See also